Tunick is a Jewish surname, a variant of Tunik.

List
Notable people with the surname include:

Irving "Irve" Tunick (1912-1987), American film and TV screenwriter, radio scriptwriter, and television producer.
Jonathan Tunick (born 1938), American orchestrator, musical director and composer
Spencer Tunick (born 1967), American photographer

References